EDTMP or ethylenediamine tetra(methylene phosphonic acid)  is a phosphonic acid. It has chelating and anti corrosion properties. EDTMP is the phosphonate analog of EDTA. It is classified as a nitrogenous organic polyphosphonic acid.

Properties and applications
EDTMP is normally delivered as its sodium salt, which exhibits good solubility in water.

Used in Water treatment as an antiscaling and anti corrosion agent, the corrosion inhibition of EDTMP is 3–5 times better than that of inorganic polyphosphate.  It has good chemical stability and thermal tolerance. It shows excellent scale inhibition ability under temperature 200 °C.  It functions by chelating with many metal ions.

The anti-cancer drug Samarium (153Sm) lexidronam is also derived from EDTMP.

References

Phosphonic acids
Chelating agents
Tertiary amines
Ethyleneamines
Corrosion inhibitors
Water treatment
Hexadentate ligands